Narok (sometimes referred to as Narok Town) is a town west of Nairobi that supports Kenya's economy in south-west of the country, along the Great Rift Valley. Narok is the district capital of the Narok County and stands as the major centre of commerce in the district. Narok has a population of around 40,000 people, mostly Maasai. The elevation of Narok is 1827 metres (5,997 feet) in altitude.

Narok Town is the last major town when travelling by road from Nairobi to Maasai Mara National Park and Keekorok Lodge. Narok Town stands as a centre for services, business, and finance. For decades, Narok's economy has benefited from tourism, agriculture, livestock keeping and mining. The 30,000-capacity William Ole Ntimama Stadium, a football stadium, is located in Narok.

Education 
Narok Town has several public and private primary and secondary schools.

Public Primary Schools 

 Masikonde Primary School
 Ole Sankale Boarding School
 St. Mary's Primary School
 St. Peter's Primary
 Lenana Primary School
 Ilmashariani Primary School
Private Primary Schools:

 St. Peters Academy
 Narok County Academy 
 Ongata School
 Nasaruni Academy for Maasai Girls

Public Secondary Schools 

 Narok Boys' High School.
 Maasai Girls' High School.
Ole Tipis Secondary School
St Mary's Secondary School.
Private Secondary Schools:
 St. Stephen Nkoitoi Secondary School 
 Limanet Secondary School

Colleges 

 Narok Teachers Training College 
 Narok West Technical Training Institute
 Ludepe Teachers College 
 Lusaka Institute of Science and Technology
 Narok West Institute of Professional Studies 
 Narok Teachers Training College
 WE College

Universities
 Maasai Mara University

Religious studies 

 Bible College, Bisset Bible College

Economy 

The town has seen structural and economic growth as the roads and new construction in the area.

The Narok Stadium (now named William Ole Ntimama Stadium has been upgraded by the County Government and National Government. Narok is home to the Kenyan football club, WAZITO FC.

The main economic income is the tourism sector, which brings an estimated 10 billion Kenya Shillings annually, as well as wheat farming, which is done both in large and small scale.

Notable people
Kurito Ole Kisio.

References

 Alain Zecchini, "Kenya's battle for biodiversity" (on Narok), Le Monde diplomatique, November 2000, MondeDiplo.com, webpage: MondeDiplo-Masai.

External links
 Alain Zecchini, Kenya's battle for biodiversity.
 Profile of Narok District.

Populated places in Narok County
County capitals in Kenya